Triandomelaena albinus is a species of tephritid or fruit flies in the genus Triandomelaena of the family Tephritidae.

Distribution
East Africa.

References

Tephritinae
Taxa named by Mario Bezzi
Insects described in 1924
Diptera of Africa